Prunus trichostoma is a species of cherry found in Tibet, Gansu, Qinghai, Sichuan and Yunnan provinces of China. A shrubby tree 2 to 10m tall, it prefers to grow 1000 to 4000m above sea level. It is a common member of the shrub layer.

References

trichostoma
Cherries

Flora of Qinghai
Flora of Gansu
Flora of Tibet
Flora of South-Central China
Plants described in 1912